Ani C. Sarkisian (born 18 May 1995) is an American-born Armenian footballer who plays as a forward for the Armenia women's national team.

Early life
Sarkisian was born in Cresskill, New Jersey.

High school and college career
Sarkisian has attended the Cresskill High School in her hometown, the Florida State University in Tallahassee, Florida and the University of Michigan in Ann Arbor, Michigan.

International career
Sarkisian capped for Armenia at senior level in a 2–0 friendly win over Lebanon on 8 April 2021.

References

1995 births
Living people
Citizens of Armenia through descent
Armenian women's footballers
Women's association football midfielders
Women's association football forwards
Armenia women's international footballers
People from Cresskill, New Jersey
Sportspeople from Bergen County, New Jersey
Soccer players from New Jersey
American women's soccer players
Florida State Seminoles women's soccer players
Michigan Wolverines women's soccer players
American people of Armenian descent